Clappertown is an unincorporated community and census-designated place (CDP) in Blair County, Pennsylvania, United States. It was first listed as a CDP prior to the 2020 census.

The CDP is in southern Blair County, in the southeastern part of Greenfield Township. It is in the valley of Smoky Run, at the intersection of Cottontown/Lower Claar Road with Pine Hollow/Schellsburg Road. Smoky Run is a southeastward-flowing tributary of Beaverdam Creek, one of the headwaters of the Frankstown Branch of the Juniata River, part of the Susquehanna River watershed.

Demographics

References 

Census-designated places in Blair County, Pennsylvania
Census-designated places in Pennsylvania